"Judy" is a schlager ballad by German singer Thomas Anders. It was Thomas Anders' first single, released in 1980 on Columbia Records.

The song is a German cover version of Randy VanWarmer's "Call Me", from the album Warmer.

Track listing 
 CBS S 8873 7"
 "Judy" (Norbert Hammerschmidt/Randy Vanwarmer) - 4:50  	
 "Liebe Ist Ein Zweites Leben" (Daniel David/Norbert Hammerschmidt/Renus Gern) - 3:50

References 

1980 debut singles
Thomas Anders songs
1980s ballads
Songs written by Randy VanWarmer
Columbia Records singles
1979 songs